KPOL-LP (106.9 FM) was a radio station formerly licensed to Canyonville, Oregon, United States. The station was owned by Keep Praising Our Lord Inc.

KPOL-LP's license was cancelled by the Federal Communications Commission on February 5, 2014, due to the station having been silent since October 2, 2011.

References

External links
 

POL-LP
POL-LP
Douglas County, Oregon
Canyonville, Oregon
Defunct radio stations in the United States
Radio stations disestablished in 2014
Defunct religious radio stations in the United States
2014 disestablishments in Oregon
POL-LP